The Hughes River is a tributary of the Little Kanawha River in western West Virginia in the United States.  Via the Little Kanawha and Ohio Rivers, it is part of the watershed of the Mississippi River.  As measured from the confluence of its north and south forks, the Hughes is 18 mi (29 km) long, and drains a rural area of the unglaciated portion of the Allegheny Plateau.

The river is believed to have been discovered and named by the 18th-century settler Jesse Hughes, but it may also have been named for others of the same surname residing in the area during roughly the same time period.  According to the Geographic Names Information System, it has also been known historically as the Junius River.

Course
The Hughes flows for most of its length through Ritchie County as two streams:

The North Fork Hughes River, 57 mi (92 km) long, rises in northern Ritchie County near the community of Mountain, and flows generally southwestwardly, passing through North Bend State Park, where in 2003 it was dammed to form North Bend Lake, and through the town of Cairo.  It is crossed six times by the North Bend Rail Trail, which was a former line of the Baltimore and Ohio Railroad built between 1853 and 1857.
The South Fork Hughes River, 54 mi (87 km) long, rises in western Doddridge County, and flows generally westwardly through southern Ritchie County, past the communities of Berea, Smithville, and Macfarlan. West Virginia Route 47 roughly parallels the south fork's lower course.

The Hughes' north and south forks join near the community of Cisco and the Hughes River then flows for 18 mi (29 km) through northern Wirt County and meets the Little Kanawha River near the community of Newark, 12 mi (19 km) southeast of Parkersburg.

Varieties of fish in the Hughes River include muskellunge; rock, smallmouth and spotted bass; flathead and channel catfish; and several species of sunfish.

See also
List of West Virginia rivers

External links
North Bend State Park website

References

Rivers of West Virginia
Little Kanawha River
Rivers of Doddridge County, West Virginia
Rivers of Ritchie County, West Virginia
Rivers of Wirt County, West Virginia
Allegheny Plateau